Sir Muhammad Munawar Ali Khan KCIE (died 3 January 1903) was the Prince of Arcot from 1889 to 1903. Muhammad Munawar Khan was the nephew of Intizam-ul-Mulk, the third Prince of Arcot. He was made a Knight Commander of the Order of the Indian Empire during the reign of his uncle. He was exempted from appearing in civil courts. Khan succeeded his uncle Intizam-ul-Mulk and ruled till his death in 1903, in Delhi while attending Edward VII's coronation.

References 

 

1903 deaths
Indian Muslims
Nawabs of India
Knights Commander of the Order of the Indian Empire
Year of birth missing